The list of churches in Møre is a list of the Church of Norway churches the Diocese of Møre which covers all of Møre og Romsdal county in Norway. This list is divided into several sections, one for each deanery (prosti headed by a provost) in the diocese. Administratively within each deanery, the churches are divided by municipalities which have their own church council (fellesråd) and then into parishes (sokn) which have their own councils (soknerådet). Each parish may have one or more congregation.

Molde domprosti 
This arch-deanery is home to the Molde Cathedral, the seat of the Bishop of the Diocese of Møre. Molde domprosti covers three municipalities in Møre og Romsdal county, all of which surround the town of Molde in Molde Municipality where the deanery is headquartered. On 1 January 2019, the churches in Eide Municipality were transferred from Ytre Nordmøre prosti to Molde domprosti.

Søre Sunnmøre prosti 
This deanery covers several municipalities in southwestern part of Møre og Romsdal county.  The deanery is headquartered in the village of Volda in Volda Municipality.

Nordre Sunnmøre prosti 
This deanery covers several municipalities in western part of Møre og Romsdal county.  The deanery is headquartered in the town of Ålesund in Ålesund Municipality.

On 1 January 2020, the former Austre Sunnmøre prosti was merged into this deanery. That deanery covered six municipalities in southern part of Møre og Romsdal county.  The deanery was headquartered in the village of Sjøholt in Ørskog Municipality.

Indre Romsdal prosti 
This deanery covers two municipalities in central part of Møre og Romsdal county.  The deanery is headquartered in the town of Åndalsnes in Rauma Municipality.

Ytre Nordmøre prosti 
This deanery covers four municipalities in northwestern part of Møre og Romsdal county.  The deanery is headquartered in the town of Kristiansund in Kristiansund Municipality. On 1 January 2019, the churches in Eide Municipality were transferred from Ytre Nordmøre prosti to Molde domprosti.

In 2019, archaeologists from the Norwegian Institute for Cultural Heritage Research, using large-scale high-resolution georadar technology, determined that a 17 meter long Viking ship was buried near Edøy Church. They estimate the ship's age as over 1,000 years: from the Merovingian or Viking period; the group planned to conduct additional searches in the area. A similar burial was found previously by a NIKU team in 2018, in Gjellestad.

Indre Nordmøre prosti 
This deanery covers four municipalities in northeastern part of Møre og Romsdal county.  The deanery is headquartered in the village of Tingvollvågen in Tingvoll Municipality.  On 1 January 2020, the parishes in Rindal and Halsa were transferred to the Diocese of Nidaros to the north.

References

 
More og Romsdal